Engine cooking is the act of cooking food from the excess heat of an internal combustion engine, typically the engine of a car or a truck. This phenomenon may have started when truckers began to heat their lunch from the heat of their vehicles' engines.

It is a method that has been known for decades – not only by truckers, but also as a bushcraft by adventurers. The method of cooking with the heat of an engine is a viable way to prepare your meal while on an adventure trip, and is even known to be used by people during power cuts when they cannot use their kitchen appliances.

The first engine cooking experiments were done by hungry truckers who came up with the idea of making a small vent hole in the lid of cans of soup, and then placing it on the hot exhaust manifold before hitting the road. When arriving at the destination, lunch was ready. This however cannot be recommended as cans used for canned food are typically coated on the inside in a layer of epoxy resin.

Other communities also have embraced engine cooking, including van-dwellers and people living by the road. Several of these communities have blogged about the topic of cooking on a car engine. The website roadroast.com now defunct, was a non-profit website that was intended to teach visitors how they can get started cooking on their engines. The method has also been featured by Hugh Fearnley-Whittingstall in the 1990 TV show A Cook on the Wild Side.

The principle of preparing food from the excess heat of a car engine is simple. A hot spot is identified, such as the exhaust manifold. The food that is to be prepared is wrapped in several layers of aluminum foil, which serves two purposes. The first purpose is to act as a conductor so that heat is distributed evenly. The second purpose is to shield the food from any contaminants present in the engine compartment. The food is secured using steel wire and tied down to the hot spot. Finally the car is driven until the food has been cooked.

See also
 Manifold Destiny (cookbook) from 1989

References

External links
Cooking great meals with your car engine. The heat is on.
How To Cook on Your Car Engine Howcast 
How To Cook on Your Car Engine Howcast on YouTube
Miles for Dinner - Engine cooking

Cooking techniques